Agonopterix pullella is a moth in the family Depressariidae. It was described by Hans-Joachim Hannemann in 1971. It is found in Mongolia.

References

Moths described in 1971
Agonopterix
Moths of Asia